The Cyrano spurdog (Squalus rancureli) is a dogfish, a member of the family Squalidae, found in the western central Pacific Ocean between latitudes 16°S and 18°S at depths between 320 and 400 m.  Its length is up to 77 cm.

Its reproduction is ovoviviparous.

References 

 

Squalus
Taxa named by Pierre Fourmanoir
Taxa named by Jacques Rivaton
Fish described in 1979